Syed Iqrar Ul Hassan  (اقرار الحسن سید) is a Pakistani television presenter and journalist. He has worked at ARY News for many years. Previously a newscaster, he now hosts a program called Sar e Aam.

Incident
On April 29, 2016, Iqrar along with his Sar-e-Aam team were wrongfully arrested on orders of the Sindh Home Minister for highlighting the poor security in the Sindh Assembly, but was granted bail just a day later.

He has also done sting-operations in numerous factories, restaurants and even police stations, these places were accused of bribery, corruption, adulteration

Personal life
Iqrar Ul Hassan joined the Pakistani electronic media in 2006 as a reporter on ARY One World (now known as ARY News). He began his news coverage profession as a newscaster for ARY News. His first wife Qurat-ul-Ain Hassan now called Qurat-ul-Ain Iqrar whom he got married in 2008 is a journalist. Iqrar-ul-Hassan and Qurat-ul-Ain have a son together named Pehlaaj Hassan (b. 2010). He got married a second time with another TV journalist Farah Yousuf in 2012 in a private ceremony.

His son, Pehlaaj, is a child actor and social media personality who notably played the character of young Momin, the protagonist of the television series Alif starring Hamza Ali Abbasi. His performance received positive reviews and he was nominated for the Best Emerging Talent in TV award at the 2021 Lux Style Awards.

Awards
In 2013, he won Agahi Award for “Anchor of the Year”
In 2019, he won the tenth Pakistan Achievement Award for the “Best Tv Show of the Year” Sar-e-Aam

References

External links 
 

Living people
1985 births
Pakistani television hosts
Pakistani male journalists
ARY News newsreaders and journalists
Government College University, Lahore alumni
People from Lahore